Alec Nevala-Lee (born May 31, 1980) is an American biographer, novelist, and science fiction writer. He was a Hugo and Locus Award finalist for the group biography Astounding: John W. Campbell, Isaac Asimov, Robert A. Heinlein, L. Ron Hubbard, and the Golden Age of Science Fiction. His most recent book is Inventor of the Future, a biography of the architectural designer and futurist Buckminster Fuller, which was selected by Esquire as one of the fifty best biographies of all time.

Biography 

Nevala-Lee was born in Castro Valley, California on May 31, 1980 and graduated from Harvard College with a bachelor's degree in Classics. He is half Chinese, half Finnish and partly Estonian, and he identifies as bisexual. He and his wife Wailin Wong, a reporter and co-host for The Indicator on NPR, live in Oak Park, Illinois with their daughter. His novels include The Icon Thief, City of Exiles, and Eternal Empire, all published by Penguin Books, and his short fiction has appeared in Analog Science Fiction and Fact, Lightspeed Magazine, and two editions of The Year’s Best Science Fiction. He has written for such publications as the New York Times, Slate, the Los Angeles Times, Salon, The Daily Beast, Longreads, The Rumpus, Public Books, and the San Francisco Bay Guardian. His nonfiction book Astounding: John W. Campbell, Isaac Asimov, Robert A. Heinlein, L. Ron Hubbard, and the Golden Age of Science Fiction was released by Dey Street Books, an imprint of HarperCollins, on October 23, 2018.

In the course of researching Astounding, Nevala-Lee discovered a previously unknown draft of John W. Campbell's novella "Who Goes There?", the basis for the movie The Thing. The manuscript, Frozen Hell, is currently being developed as a feature film by Blumhouse Productions. Frozen Hell was published in 2019 by Wildside Press with introductory material by Nevala-Lee and Robert Silverberg. Astounding also served as a resource for the Washington Post podcast series Moonrise, which was produced by the reporter Lillian Cunningham. Syndromes, an audio original collection of thirteen of Nevala-Lee's stories from Analog read by Jonathan Todd Ross and Catherine Ho, was released in 2020 by Recorded Books. His biography Inventor of the Future: The Visionary Life of Buckminster Fuller was published by Dey Street Books / HarperCollins on August 2, 2022.

Influence 

Analog editor Trevor Quachri partially credited the critical picture of John W. Campbell in Nevala-Lee's book with the decision to rename the John W. Campbell Award for Best New Writer, which became the Astounding Award in August 2019. “Reading an early draft of Alec’s book is when I realized that the name change would need to happen eventually,” Quachri told The New York Times, and Nevala-Lee stated that he supported the change: “It was clearly the right call. At this point, the contrast between Campbell’s racism and the diversity of the writers who have recently received the award was really just too glaring to ignore.” In her acceptance speech for the 2020 Hugo Award for Best Related Work, writer Jeannette Ng, whose speech criticizing Campbell the previous year was widely seen as catalyzing the name change, thanked Nevala-Lee, "who wrote the book and brought the receipts."

Writing in The New Republic, the critic Rebecca Onion noted a common theme in Nevala-Lee's choice of subjects: "Nevala-Lee is something of an expert in a very specific type: twentieth-century men, working on the fringes of stem careers, who channeled the technological optimism of the years between World War I and the 1970s into careers as media icons." Nevala-Lee's work has been cited by multiple publications, including The Atlantic, for its treatment of the author Isaac Asimov's conduct toward women and its impact on the science fiction community. While researching Astounding, Nevala-Lee also uncovered an unpublished manuscript, "A Criticism of Dianetics," co-authored by L. Ron Hubbard in 1949, which the noted Scientology critic Tony Ortega has described as "a stunning document." In June 2022, Nevala-Lee published an investigative article in Slate, "False Flag," that debunked the myth—which had been cited as fact in numerous sources, including Wikipedia—that an Ohio teenager named Robert G. Heft had designed the 50-star flag of the United States.

Work 
Nevala-Lee's debut novel, The Icon Thief, a conspiracy thriller inspired by the work of artist Marcel Duchamp, received a starred review from Publishers Weekly. A sequel, City of Exiles, is partially based on the Dyatlov Pass incident, while the concluding novel in the trilogy, Eternal Empire, incorporates elements from the myth of Shambhala. On the science fiction side, Locus critic Rich Horton has identified a tendency in Nevala-Lee's work "to present a situation which suggests a fantastical or science-fictional premise, and then to turn the idea on its head, not so much by debunking the central premise, or explaining it away in mundane terms, but by giving it a different, perhaps more scientifically rigorous, science-fictional explanation.” Analog has characterized him as an author of "tale[s] set in an atypical location, with science fiction that arrives from an unexpected direction,” while Locus reviews editor Jonathan Strahan has said that Nevala-Lee's fiction "has been some of the best stuff in Analog in the last ten years." The Wall Street Journal has called Nevala-Lee "a talented science fiction writer," and Jim Killen of Tor has written that he has earned "a reputation as one of the smartest young SFF writers out there."

Nevala-Lee's book Astounding—a group biography of the editor John W. Campbell and the science fiction writers Isaac Asimov, Robert A. Heinlein, and L. Ron Hubbard—was a 2019 Hugo Award finalist for Best Related Work and Locus Award finalist for Non-Fiction. Its Chinese translation by Sun Yanan received a Silver Xingyun Award for Best Translated Work. The Economist named it one of the best books of 2018, calling it "an indispensable book for anyone trying to understand the birth and meaning of modern science fiction in America from the 1930s to the 1950s—a genre that reshaped how people think about the future, for good and ill." The science fiction writer Barry N. Malzberg described it as "the most important historical and critical work my field has ever seen," while the editor Patrick Nielsen Hayden praised it as "one of the greatest works of science fiction history ever," and the author George R.R. Martin called it "an amazing and engrossing history." In a starred review, Publishers Weekly described it as "a major work of popular culture scholarship," and it received positive notices from Michael Saler of The Wall Street Journal, James Sallis of The Magazine of Fantasy & Science Fiction, and Michael Dirda of The Washington Post. In SFRA Review, the critic Andy Duncan praised its writing and research, but questioned the continuing relevance of the book's four subjects: "As I enjoy and admire it, I can’t help but wonder whether it hasn’t been published a generation too late."

In 2022, Nevala-Lee published Inventor of the Future: The Visionary Life of Buckminster Fuller, which was positively received by critics. The biography was a New York Times Book Review Editors' Choice and received starred reviews from Kirkus Reviews and Booklist. In the New York Times, the architect Witold Rybczynski wrote, "In his public appearances, Fuller could come across as a selfless seer, almost a secular saint; in Nevala-Lee’s biography he is all too human...The strength of this carefully researched and fair-minded biography is that the reader comes away with a greater understanding of a deeply complicated individual who overcame obstacles—many of his own making—to achieve a kind of imperfect greatness."  Rebecca Onion of The New Republic praised the book as "meticulous and clearly written," but questioned the value of Fuller's legacy: "Despite his shortcomings as a thinker and a person, Inventor of the Future insists, many brilliant people—from the sculptor Isamu Noguchi, his longtime friend and collaborator; John Cage and Merce Cunningham, his colleagues at Black Mountain College; designer Edwin Schlossberg, his later-in-life protégé; Nevala-Lee himself—have loved Fuller, and found something in his ideas. This must mean something, but what?" In The New York Review of Books, James Gleick noted that the biography "diligently deconstruct[s] Fuller’s mythmaking." A review in The Economist, which named it one of the best books of the year, described Nevala-Lee as "a sure-footed guide to a dizzying life," while also noting, "The book’s approach to this protean career is relentlessly chronological; incident follows incident at breakneck speed, a structure that captures Fuller’s irrepressible energy but sometimes leaves the reader exhausted."

Bibliography

Novels

Short fiction
Collections
 
Stories

Nonfiction
Books
 
  
Essays and reporting
 "Marcel Duchamp’s Turning Point." Los Angeles Times, March 18, 2012.
 "Karl Rove’s Labyrinth." The Daily Beast, November 20, 2012.
 "Lessons from The X-Files." Salon, September 17, 2013.
 "Xenu’s Paradox: The Fiction of L. Ron Hubbard and the Making of Scientology." Longreads, February 1, 2017.
 "The Campbell Machine." Analog Science Fiction and Fact, July/August 2018.
 "Dawn of Dianetics: L. Ron Hubbard, John W. Campbell, and the Origins of Scientology." Longreads, October 23, 2018.
 "What Isaac Asimov Taught Us About Predicting the Future." The New York Times, October 31, 2018. Appeared in the print edition on November 3, 2018, under the headline "Back to the Future."
 "How Astounding Saw the Future." The New York Times, January 10, 2019. Appeared in the print edition on January 13, 2019, under the headline "Simply Astounding."
 "A 1995 Novel Predicted Trump's America." The New York Times, July 12, 2019. Essay on The Tunnel by William H. Gass. Appeared in the print edition on July 14, 2019, under the headline "The Party of the Disappointed People." 
 "Making Waves: The Inventions of John W. Campbell." Analog Science Fiction and Fact, January/February 2020. Written with Edward J. Wysocki, Jr.
 "Asimov's Empire, Asimov's Wall." Public Books, January 7, 2020.
 "False Flag." Slate, July 30, 2022. Essay disproving Robert G. Heft's claim to have designed the 50-star flag of the United States.

Other media

 "Retention." Episode of the audio science fiction series The Outer Reach. Released on December 21, 2016. Featuring the voices of Aparna Nancherla and Echo Kellum.

References

External links 
 
 
Alec Nevala-Lee at the Encyclopedia of Science Fiction
 Alec Nevala-Lee Interview at Writers Digest
 Alec Nevala-Lee Interview at Lightspeed Magazine
Alec Nevala-Lee Interview at the Christian Science Monitor
Alec Nevala-Lee Interview at Syfy Wire
Alec Nevala-Lee Interview at Space.com
Alec Nevala-Lee on BookTV on C-SPAN2

Living people
21st-century American novelists
21st-century American male writers
American male novelists
American science fiction writers
American thriller writers
Analog Science Fiction and Fact people
Harvard University alumni
People from Castro Valley, California
Critics of Scientology
American biographers
1980 births
American people of Chinese descent
American people of Estonian descent
American people of Finnish descent
American male biographers